"B-A-B-Y" is a 1966 song written by Isaac Hayes and David Porter. The song was first recorded in 1966 by Carla Thomas.  Her version was released as the opening track of her album Carla, and as a single by Stax Records.

Chart performance
In the US, the single reached no. 14 on the US pop chart and no. 3 on the R&B chart.

Cover versions
The song was recorded in the UK in 1967 by The Ferris Wheel, featuring singer Diane Ferraz.  
The song was recorded in 1969 by the chilean band Aguaturbia on their debut album. 
It was also recorded in 1977 by American singer Rachel Sweet, whose version on the Stiff label reached no. 35 on the UK singles chart.

Popular culture
The song was featured in the 2017 film Baby Driver.

References

1966 songs
Songs written by David Porter (musician)
Songs written by Isaac Hayes
Stax Records singles